Paul Webb (born 30 November 1967) is an English former footballer who played as a midfielder.

Career
Webb started his career with English sixth tier side Bromsgrove Rovers, helping them earn their first-ever promotion to the English fifth tier. In 1994, he signed for Kidderminster Harriers in the English fifth tier, helping them earn their first-ever promotion to the English fourth tier. Before the second half of 2001–02, Webb signed for English seventh tier club Evesham United.

References

External links
 
 Paul Webb at Harriers Online

Living people
1967 births
English footballers
Footballers from Wolverhampton
Association football midfielders
English Football League players
National League (English football) players
Southern Football League players
Bromsgrove Rovers F.C. players
Evesham United F.C. players
Hereford United F.C. players
Kidderminster Harriers F.C. players